Bee Hive Records was a jazz record company and label established in 1977 by Jim and Susan Neumann in Chicago.

Bee Hive was named for the club of the same name. Sometimes it recorded musicians who had started in Chicago, such as Junior Mance and Clifford Jordan. The first album was by Nick Brignola in 1977. Bee Hive was its own distributor, and its albums were not as widely available as those from other companies.

In 2015, Mosaic Records released The Complete Bee Hive Sessions (Mosaic MD12-261), a 12-CD box set consisting of sixteen Bee Hive recording sessions from 1977 to 1984.

Discography

References

External links 
 

Jazz record labels